In England and Wales, Northern Ireland, and the Republic of Ireland, an urban district was a type of local government district that covered an urbanised area.  Urban districts had an elected urban district council (UDC), which shared local government responsibilities with a county council.

England and Wales
In England and Wales, urban districts and rural districts were created in 1894 (by the Local Government Act 1894) as subdivisions of administrative counties.

They replaced the earlier system of urban and rural sanitary districts (based on poor law unions) the functions of which were taken over by the district councils. The district councils also had wider powers over local matters such as parks, cemeteries and local planning. An urban district usually contained a single parish, while a rural district might contain many. Urban districts were considered to have more problems with public health than rural areas, and so urban district councils had more funding and greater powers than comparable rural districts.

Urban districts normally covered smaller towns, usually with populations of less than 30,000. Originally there had been 1,009 urban districts but implementation of the recommendations of a series of county reviews as established by the Local Government Act 1929 saw a net decrease of 159 in the number of urban districts between 1932 and 1938. In many instances smaller urban districts were merged with their surrounding rural districts, with the result that new districts emerged covering rural as well as urban parishes. At the same time, a number of larger urban districts became municipal boroughs (as already created, in 1835 under the Municipal Reform Act 1835): these had a slightly higher status and the right to appoint a mayor.

Urban districts in the outer London area were absorbed into London Boroughs in 1965 as a consequence of the London Government Act 1963. All remaining urban districts in England and Wales were abolished in 1974 by the Local Government Act 1972, and replaced with a uniform system of larger districts – see Districts of England and Districts of Wales – which often covered both urban and rural areas. Many parish councils in England were created for towns previously covered by urban districts and, as a result of subsequent legislation, all urban and rural areas in Wales are today covered by 870 communities as sub-entities of 22 unitary authorities (or principal areas).

Ireland

In Ireland urban districts were created in 1898 by the Local Government (Ireland) Act 1898 based on the urban sanitary districts created by the Public Health (Ireland) Act 1878, and the suburban townships adjacent to Dublin city. Urban districts had powers greater than towns with town commissioners but less than the municipal boroughs preserved by the Municipal Corporations (Ireland) Act 1840 or created subsequently. A few places were promoted or demoted between these three categories in subsequent decades.

After the partition of Ireland in 1920–22 urban districts continued in both the Irish Free State (now the Republic of Ireland) and Northern Ireland.

Northern Ireland
The rural and urban districts in Northern Ireland were abolished in 1973, and replaced with a system of unitary districts.

Republic of Ireland
In the Republic, while rural districts were abolished in 1925 and 1930, urban districts continued to exist.

In 1930 the Borough of Dún Laoghaire was created as part of the reforms enacted in County Dublin by the Local Government (Dublin) Act 1930. The new borough was formed by amalgamating the four urban districts of Blackrock, Dalkey, Dún Laoghaire, and Killiney and Ballybrack.

The urban district of Galway was elevated to the status of borough in the 1930s.

A small number of other urban districts underwent a change of status over time:
 Pembroke and Rathmines and Rathgar, previously within the county of Dublin, were both abolished and incorporated into the city of Dublin in 1930
 Howth, also previously within the county of Dublin, was similarly abolished and incorporated into the city of Dublin in 1942
 Passage West ceased to exist in 1942
 Granard ceased to exist in 1944
 Belturbet ceased to exist in 1950

The above changes left a total of 49 urban districts in being, which continued unchanged into the 1990s. Numerous changes to boundaries with adjoining local authorities were also made over the years.

Urban districts were renamed as "towns" under the Local Government Act 2001. These were in turn abolished in 2014 under the Local Government Reform Act 2014.

See also
Small burgh (approximate equivalent in Scotland)

References

Local government in the Republic of Ireland
Defunct types of subdivision in the United Kingdom